Trevis Gipson (born June 13, 1997) is an American football defensive end for the Chicago Bears of the National Football League (NFL). He played college football at Tulsa.

College career
During high school, Gipson played high school football at Cedar Hill High School And was on the 2014 State Championship team. A 2-star recruit, Gipson committed to Tulsa on November 15, 2014, choosing the Golden Hurricane over Tennessee State.

After redshirting for a year and seeing reserve action in his freshman and sophomore seasons, Gipson gained a starting role for his junior season in 2018 and had five forced fumbles, tied for second in the FBS. Pro Football Focus put Gipson in their first-team all-AAC for his stopping power and ability to pressure quarterbacks.

Before his senior season, Gipson was invited by Von Miller to Miller's pass rush summit.

After his senior season, Gipson earned first-team all-American Athletic Conference for his play. He participated in the 2020 Senior Bowl and 2020 NFL Combine.

Statistics

Professional career
Gipson was selected by the Chicago Bears with the 155th pick in the fifth round of the 2020 NFL Draft. He signed a four-year rookie contract with the team on July 21.

During the 2021 NFL season, Gipson played in 16 games, recording 39 tackles, seven sacks, and forcing five fumbles.

On September 18, 2022, Gipson recorded two sacks during a 27-10 loss to the Green Bay Packers.

NFL career statistics

Personal life
Trevis' brother Thomas Gipson is a professional football player.

References

External links
Tulsa bio

1997 births
Living people
People from Cedar Hill, Texas
Sportspeople from the Dallas–Fort Worth metroplex
Players of American football from Texas
American football defensive ends
Tulsa Golden Hurricane football players
Chicago Bears players
American football linebackers